Lier Basketball Club was a professional basketball club based in the municipality of Lier, Belgium.

Honours and titles
Belgian League
 Champions (2): 1970–71, 1971–72
Belgian Cup
 Winners (1): 1974–75
 Runners-up (5): 1969–70, 1971–72, 1972–73, 1973–74, 1975–76

Defunct basketball teams in Belgium